Danielzinho may refer to the following people:

 Danielzinho (footballer, born 1983), Brazilian footballer Daniel Ferreira Pereira
 Danielzinho (footballer, born 1988), Brazilian footballer Daniel Tiago Duarte
 Danielzinho (footballer, born 1994), Brazilian footballer Daniel de Oliveira Sertanejo
 Danielzinho (footballer, born 1996), Brazilian footballer Daniel Sampaio Simões